The NASCAR Cup Series Drivers' Championship is awarded by the chairman of NASCAR to the most successful NASCAR Cup Series racing car driver over a season, as determined by a points system based on race results. The Drivers' Championship was first awarded in 1949 to Red Byron. The first driver to win multiple Championships was Herb Thomas in 1951 and 1953. The current Drivers' Champion is Joey Logano, who won his second NASCAR Cup Series championship in 2022.

The NASCAR points system has undergone several incarnations since its initial implementation. Originally, races awarded points by a complicated system based upon final positioning and weighted by prize money purses, such that higher-paying events gave more points. Soon after the advent of the modern era in 1972, the championship was decided by a more basic cumulative point total based solely upon a driver's finishing position in each race. In order to reduce the possibility of a driver clinching before the final event, NASCAR implemented the "Chase for the Cup" in 2004 which, with minor modification from 2004 to 2013 and more radical changes in 2014, stands as the current format. Before the final ten races, 16 drivers, chosen primarily on race wins, are reset to an equal number of points, with bonus points awarded to a driver for each win prior to the reset.  With these changes, the last Drivers' Champion to clinch before the final race was Matt Kenseth in 2003.

Overall, thirty-five different drivers have won the Championship, with Richard Petty, Dale Earnhardt, and Jimmie Johnson holding the record for most titles at seven. Johnson has the record for most consecutive Drivers' Championships, winning five from 2006 to 2010.  Thus far, every champion has originated from the United States.

By season

By drivers

As of completion of the seventy-fourth season (2022), 35 different drivers have won a NASCAR Cup Series Drivers' Championshipwith 17 of these drivers winning more than once.

Records

Consecutive Drivers' Championships

As of completion of the 2020 season, ten drivers have achieved consecutive wins in the NASCAR Cup Series Drivers' Championship.

Regular Season Champions 
Since 2018 NASCAR has awarded a regular season championship which recognizes the best driver with the most points through the first 26 rounds of competition before the playoffs begin with 2017 being grandfathered in.

See also

 NASCAR
 NASCAR Cup Series
 List of NASCAR Manufacturers' champions
 List of NASCAR Xfinity Series champions
 List of NASCAR Truck Series champions
 List of all-time NASCAR Cup Series winners
 List of NASCAR teams
 List of NASCAR drivers
 List of NASCAR race tracks

Notes

References
General

Specific

 
NASCAR Cup Series
Cup Series
Cup